Arkansas Highway 356 (AR 356, Hwy. 356) is an east–west state highway in north-central Arkansas. The route of  runs from Highway 92 near Bee Branch east to Highway 25 and Highway 124 in Quitman.

Route description
Highway 356 begins at Highway 92 near Bee Branch. The route runs east for through a sparsely populated area in east Van Buren County before entering Cleburne County and meeting the southern end of Highway 255. At this junction, the route turns south to Quitman where it intersects a concurrency between Highway 25/Highway 124 and terminates.

Major intersections

References

356
Transportation in Cleburne County, Arkansas
Transportation in Van Buren County, Arkansas